Francisco Gómez Palacio y Bravo (1824 — 1886) was a Mexican politician.

Gómez Palacio may also refer to:

 Gómez Palacio Municipality, Durango
 Gómez Palacio, Durango